Dame Barbara Mary Kelly,  (born 27 February 1940) is a Scottish civic activist. She is chairman of the Dumfries and Galloway Arts Festival, and Convener of the Crichton Foundation. She is also chair of the Peter Pan Moat Brae Trust.

A past Chair of the Scottish Consumer Council and the Millennium Forest for Scotland Trust, a past Main Board Member of Scottish Natural Heritage and of Scottish Enterprise, Kelly worked for the interests of rural Scotland, founding, to that end, Rural Forum and the Southern Uplands Partnership. She was a member of the Royal Society of Edinburgh's Foot and Mouth Inquiry in 2002. She is a member of the Rural Development Council and is president and Chair of the Galloway National Park Association. She was Equal Opportunities Commissioner for Scotland.

Memberships
A former chairman of the Architects Registration Board, Kelly was named an Honorary Fellow of the Royal Incorporation of Architects in Scotland in 2008. Kelly was also elected a Fellow of the Royal Society of Edinburgh in 2017.

Honours
She was elevated from CBE to DBE in the June 2007 Birthday Honours List for "public service in Scotland".

References

External links
BBC News notice of Kelly's damehood
Dumfries and Galloway Festival
Galloway National Park Association

1940 births
Dames Commander of the Order of the British Empire
Living people
People from Dumfries and Galloway
Scottish activists
Place of birth missing (living people)
Fellows of the Royal Incorporation of Architects in Scotland
Fellows of the Royal Scottish Geographical Society
Fellows of the Royal Society of Edinburgh
Deputy Lieutenants of Dumfries